The goitered or black-tailed gazelle (Gazella subgutturosa) is a gazelle found in Georgia, Turkey, Azerbaijan, Iran, parts of Iraq and Pakistan, Afghanistan, Tajikistan, Kyrgyzstan, Uzbekistan, Turkmenistan, Kazakhstan and in northwest China and Mongolia. The specific name, meaning "full below the throat", refers to the male having an enlargement of the neck and throat during the mating season.

Distribution and habitat 
The goitered gazelle inhabits sands and gravel plains and limestone plateau.
Large herds were also present in the Near East. Some 6,000 years ago, they were captured and killed with the help of desert kites. Rock art found in Jordan suggests that it was slaughtered ritually.

Behaviour and ecology 
Its mating behaviour is polygynous and usually occurs in the early winter.
It runs at high speed, without the leaping, bounding gait seen in other gazelle species. Throughout much of its range, the goitered gazelle migrates seasonally.

Taxonomy
Several subspecies have been described, and four forms are distinguished, which used to be treated as separate monotypic species. Gazella marica was traditionally recognised as a subspecies, but has been identified as a species in 2011.

Persian gazelle (Gazella (subgutturosa) subgutturosa) - southeastern Turkey, Azerbaijan, Georgia, Syria, northern and eastern Iraq, Iran, southern Afghanistan, western Pakistan
Turkmen gazelle (Gazella (subgutturosa) gracilicornis) - Kazakhstan (Buzachi) in the east to about Lake Balkash, Turkmenistan, Tajikistan
Yarkand gazelle (Gazella (subgutturosa) yarkandensis) - northern and northwestern China (Xinjiang, Qinghai, Shaanxi, Gansu, Nei Monggol), Mongolia; includes subspecies hilleriana.

Former subspecies 

The Arabian sand gazelle (Gazella marica) occurs in Saudi Arabia, southern Syria, southwestern Iraq, United Arab Emirates, Oman, offshore Persian Gulf islands.

Until recently, goitered gazelles were considered to represent a single, albeit polymorphic, species. However, recent genetic studies show one of the subspecies, G. s. marica, is paraphyletic in respect to the other populations of goitered gazelles,

References

External links 

goitered gazelle
goitered gazelle
Mammals of Central Asia
Mammals of Western Asia
Mammals of Azerbaijan
Mammals of Pakistan
Mammals of Afghanistan
Mammals of the Middle East
Mammals of Mongolia
Mammals of Turkey
Fauna of Iraq
goitered gazelle
goitered gazelle